Danny Ray Johnson (October 18, 1960December 13, 2017) was an American religious leader and politician whose many extravagant lifetime claims were refuted in an exposé released two days before his suicide.  Married twice with five children, Johnson was originally from Louisiana, but had settled in Kentucky's Louisville metropolitan area by the 1980s.  Throughout his life, Johnson claimed to have been involved with many prominent Americans and in many important US events; however, evidence would later come to light disputing most of these claims.

After becoming involved with Christianity in his youth, Johnson traveled with missionaries in Tennessee and South America before founding a controversial Louisville-area church in the late 1970s—Heart of Fire Church.  With Johnson as its bishop, Heart of Fire eschewed the trappings of traditional Christian churches, and instead at times featured toplessness, cigarette-smoking, underage drinking, anti-Islamism, and a tattoo parlor.  Following arson in 2000, the church was rebuilt after Johnson was sued by his insurance provider.

In the 2010s, Johnson became politically active, and despite a controversial campaign that included his own party leadership asking for his withdrawal, he was elected to the Kentucky House of Representatives from the 49th District.  After 11 months and nine days in office, an exposé by the Kentucky Center for Investigative Reporting was publicly released; it included many refutations of Johnson's self-described biography, as well as details about a 2013 child sexual abuse allegation.  After denying the accusations of his alleged victim, Johnson fatally shot himself on December 13, 2017.

According to Johnson's Kentucky House of Representatives profile, he was a Republican, a Kentucky Colonel, and a member of the National Rifle Association of Kentucky.

Personal life
On October 18, 1960, Danny Ray Johnson was born to Jerry J. and Charlene Blocker Johnson in Bastrop, Louisiana; he was the middle child between sisters Teresa (older) and Rita (younger). Johnson graduated from Bastrop High School in 1979, and left home when 17 years old. By his early 20s, Johnson had fathered a child, divorced his first wife—Tylia Harris, and filed for bankruptcy in Louisiana. Johnson married his second wife, Rebecca Wilson (born ), in Jefferson County, Kentucky on February 14, 1987. By 2017, Johnson resided in Mount Washington, Kentucky, and had five children. Johnson was known for his hate speech, Facebook posts, "and general derision for African-Americans and Muslims".

Refuted claims
On October 18, 1985, police in Louisville, Kentucky found two people about to set fire to Johnson's car. Johnson initially signed a police report saying the vehicle was stolen, but later admitted to the insurance fraud scheme. Felony and misdemeanor charges were dismissed after Johnson completed a six-month diversion program. In later years, Johnson said: "When the car came up missing, I didn't know what happened to the car. It was vandalized."

To Johnson's claim of having been the "White House Chaplain" to Presidents George H. W. Bush, Bill Clinton, and George W. Bush, an expert in the field confirmed that no such position exists; all three presidential libraries also confirmed "find[ing] no connection between Johnson and the White House".  The Rev. Dr. Cecil Murray of the First African Methodist Episcopal Church of Los Angeles refuted Johnson's claim of setting up safe zones in that city during the 1992 Los Angeles riots, not only by virtue of not having seen the "golden-haired preacher from Kentucky" among the rioting people of color, but also because there were no "safe zones" during the six-day incident.

Johnson regularly told of how he rushed to Ground Zero after the September 11 attacks, created an impromptu morgue, and administered last rites to victims for two weeks.  Storm Swain, a professor of theology at Lutheran Theological Seminary at Philadelphia who authored a book on chaplains at Ground Zero, invalidated every aspect of Johnson's September 11 claims.  In 2017, the Office of Chief Medical Examiner of the City of New York knew nobody who remembered Johnson.  Johnson's 2016 and 2017 financial disclosures listed New York workers' compensation as his only source of income.

Johnson had claimed, at times under oath, to hold a Doctor of Theology, a Doctor of Philosophy, and a Doctor of Divinity, the last of these from Kingsway University and Theological Seminary in Des Moines, Iowa; Kingsway confirmed that Johnson studied there, but said he did not graduate.  In his 2016 election campaign, Johnson claimed that Ted Nugent had endorsed his election during a rally at Bowman Field; spokeswomen for the musician and airport both said they had no record of this.

Religion
Johnson pointed to a childhood miracle as the incident that spurred his religiosity.  Johnson said that a childhood accident with a BB gun left him blinded in one or both of his eyes, and that his parents took him to a physician.  Johnson would later say that he was seven years old when his blindness was miraculously cured.  During his adolescence, Johnson attended the Swartz First Assembly of God Church in Monroe, Louisiana; Pastor Gerald Lewis recalls that Johnson, to whom he was a father figure and mentor, stopped attending church without warning or explanation.  After graduating high school at age 17, Johnson left Bastrop to work with the McKeithens—a Christian missions group based out of Nashville, Tennessee—for two years.

When Dr. David Fischer was pastor of the Living Waters Church in Pasadena, California, he wrote a letter supporting alleged miracles performed by Johnson while Johnson was on a short-term mission to South America; Fischer said in his June 1991 correspondence that Johnson had cured a Venezuelan man of deafness and resurrected a Colombian man: "He spoke to death and commanded it to leave."

Heart of Fire Church

According to the church's website, Johnson founded Heart of Fire Church in 1977, at 5101 Bardstown Road, with himself as its bishop.

Over its lifetime, Heart of Fire has drawn criticism from members of the local community and law-enforcement figures.  Johnson frequently proselytized for political candidates (e.g. Donald Trump) from his pulpit, violating the conditions of Heart of Fire's tax-exempt status.  Racism, toplessness, cigarette-smoking, underage drinking, Islamophobia, and a tattoo parlor were all reported phenomena at Johnson's Heart of Fire Church throughout the years.  Thrice in six years, the church was cited for selling alcoholic drinks without a liquor license; after a 2009 raid by the Kentucky Office of Alcoholic Beverage Control (ABC), Johnson was fined  despite attempting to convince Judge Sheila Collins that the beer that had been hidden from ABC agents was for communion rites.

After Dan Johnson took his own life in 2017, his wife Rebecca took over as pastor of the church.

Arson
In mid-2000, Brotherhood Mutual Insurance Company showed the non-denominational Heart of Fire Church was bankrupt: loans far exceeded the property's value, any potential sale, and the church's potential to ever settle.  The church and Johnsons were also in financial straits with "dozens of bounced checks and credit card debts".  Heart of Fire secretary and parishioner Michelle Cook explained how Johnson committed insurance fraud against Brotherhood Mutual to make money for himself.

On June 12, 2000, the church was set afire.  When a witness saw a "white, late-model Cadillac pulling out from behind the church with no lights on [whose] driver was a white guy who might have had blond hair", the blond, 1995 white-Cadillac-owning Johnson instead blamed the Ku Klux Klan, saying the hate group had threatened the church.  No charges were ever filed in the church arson.  The losses were estimated at $1–1.75million (equivalent to about $–M in ).  Brotherhood Mutual sued Heart of Fire, saying that the church had been negligent in light of the alleged threats; both parties settled and the church was rebuilt.

Foreclosure

In the 1990s, the Clinton administration's Department of Housing and Urban Development (HUD) began offering loan guarantees to rebuild black churches that were victims of arson. In 2019, Clinton-era HUD secretary Henry Cisneros described Heart of Fire's purchase and construction as not "meet[ing] the criteria that we originally had set". Less than a month after securing the guaranteed loan, and for the next 14 years, Johnson failed to have the loan forgiven. In 2009, the US federal government obtained the mortgage for Heart of Fire. Heart of Fire was scheduled to hold a May 20, 2018 auction ("antiques, appliances, furniture, Harley Davidson parts and commercial kitchen equipment"), the purpose of which was described to WDRB by Pastor Rebecca Johnson as:

Rape allegation
At age eight, Maranda Richmond first attended Heart of Fire Church in 2004 with her father.  She became friends with the Johnson children and considered Dan Johnson "a second dad".  Richmond attended parties and sleepovers that were held at the church building as well as the Johnsons' house; occasionally alcoholic drinks were provided to the children by Johnson and other adults.  Richmond told the Kentucky Center for Investigative Reporting (KyCIR) that she was raped by Johnson 15 days after her 17th birthday (the night of December 31, 2012); she had been staying with his daughter in the apartment under the fellowship hall.  The following day, the two exchanged messages over Facebook:

Richmond and her parents went to the police in April 2013, but after failing to secretly record a confession from Johnson, the case was closed with no charges filed.  Richmond saw a mental health professional the summer of 2013, and presented her "psychosocial assessment, notes and progress reports" to the KyCIR in 2017; the onetime honors student and drum major at Louisville Male High School had exhibited symptoms of posttraumatic stress disorder.  After the KyCIR began investigating Johnson, the Louisville Metro Police Department reached out to Richmond and reopened the case at her request, but had made no actions as of five months later.

Politics
In the 2010s, Johnson began to zealously express right-wing and libertarian political sentiments.

2016 elections
Johnson ran in the Republican Party's primary for the 49th District's seat (representing part of Bullitt County, Kentucky) in the Kentucky House of Representatives; his political campaign mirrored his personal ideals of "supporting guns, liberty and pro-life causes".  During a political rally at Heart of Fire, the church's billboard read, "Pray To Make America Great Again".  Jennifer Stepp (a former Heart of Fire congregant) originally won the Republican primary, but was found by a judge to have been ineligible to run.  The Bullitt County Republican Party executive committee held a secret ballot and selected Johnson as their replacement candidate.

In the general election for the 49th District's seat, Johnson faced the incumbent Democrat, Linda H. Belcher (born ).  Belcher had held the 49th seat for three terms after replacing her husband in 2008.  Johnson eschewed their public debate in favor of making online accusations against Belcher, alleging that she ("lyin' Linda") had—among other accusations—instigated death threats and bomb threats, doxxed the Johnsons, and colluded with Barack Obama ("the Islam’crat") and Hillary Clinton to send "Chicago thugs" after Johnson's family.  Belcher refuted Johnson's claims, but otherwise ran a subdued campaign, focusing instead on her record as representative.  Also during his campaign, Johnson made several Facebook posts that racially-targeted the family of Barack Obama, and then refused to withdraw from the race even at the request of the Republican Party of Kentucky.

On Election Day 2016, Republican Donald Trump received almost 75% of Bullitt County's votes for president, while Johnson defeated Belcher by 156 votes.

Representative
Johnson began his tenure in the Kentucky House on January 2, 2017.

Despite its unconstitutionality, Johnson filed a bill (Abolition of Abortion in Kentucky Act) to make abortions performed in Kentucky illegal.  Physicians who performed abortions under the proposed law could be charged with "fetal homicide—a felony that can be charged as a capital offense but isn't eligible for the death penalty".  Johnson also filed bills concerning freedom of speech.  One such proposal would have forced public universities to allow the promulgation of speech that is "offensive, unwise, immoral, indecent, disagreeable, conservative, liberal, traditional, radical, or wrongheaded".  The other would require all internet-accessible computers sold in Kentucky to come pre-installed with software to block "obscenity, child pornography, revenge pornography, and prostitution".

As of November 14, 2017, he was a member of the House's committees on: State Government; Tourism, Small Business, and Information Technology; Transportation; Veterans, Military Affairs, and Public Protection; Elections, Constitutional Amendments, and Intergovernmental Affairs; and Tourism and Outdoor Recreation.

Exposé and suicide

On December 11, 2017, the Kentucky Center for Investigative Reporting (KyCIR) released an exposé on Johnson ("The Pope's Long Con"), the culmination of over seven months of investigations and 100+ interviews.  Both Democrats and Republicans called for his resignation from the Kentucky General Assembly.  The Republican governor of Kentucky, Matt Bevin, called the representative "an embarrassment", while the Democratic mayor of Louisville Metro initiated a review of Richmond's 2013 allegations.

Johnson held a news conference two days later at Heart of Fire Church where he denied the accusations of sexual assault, instead saying that Richmond's claims stemmed from their political differences. After pinging the assemblyman's phone, police found his body on a bank of the Salt River in Mount Washington, Kentucky; he had shot himself in the head with a .40-caliber pistol. The time of death was recorded as 8:20p.m. The next day, Rebecca Johnson told reporters, "These high-tech lynchings based on lies and half-truths can’t be allowed to win the day"; on Today, she blamed the KyCIR ("that little greasy reporter") for her husband's death. Dan Johnson was interred in a Mount Washington cemetery on December 18, 2017.

Nominated by the Bullitt County Republican Party, Rebecca Johnson sought election to her husband's position as state representative from the 49th District.  Of the 4947 votes cast in the February 20, 2018 special election, Democrat Linda H. Belcher received 68.45 percent; Johnson blamed electoral fraud for her loss.  By February 2018, both women were registered for the 2018 general election, though Johnson withdrew the following month, saying, "I feel my time can be best served with my family and my ministry".

See also
 George Santos, U.S. House of Representatives member known for having lied extensively about his past
 Douglas R. Stringfellow, one-term Utah congressman known for having lied extensively about his past

References

External links
 

1960 births
2017 suicides
21st-century American bishops
21st-century American politicians
American people who fabricated academic degrees
American politicians who committed suicide
bishops in Kentucky
burials in Kentucky
Kentucky Republicans
members of the Kentucky House of Representatives
people from Bastrop, Louisiana
people from Bullitt County, Kentucky
suicides by firearm in Kentucky